The Upper Eastern District is  a subregion of the Colombian Department of Caldas.

Manzanares
Marquetalia
Marulanda
Pensilvania

References 

Subregions of Caldas Department